Zachary Baird (born February 16, 1971) is an American keyboardist known for collaborating with the nu metal band Korn. He is also noted for using the Moog synthesizer, as well as the Ondes Martenot.

Early life 
Zach Baird graduated from the Arts Magnet, Booker T. Washington High School for the Performing and Visual Arts in Dallas, Texas.  A high school that has produced other artist such as musicians Edie Brickell, Erykah Badu, jazz trumpet player Roy Hargrove, singer-songwriter Patrice Pike, and singer Norah Jones.

Career 
Baird's first project was a 15-piece funk band called Whitey, but he then joined the band Billy Goat in 1990 and was a member for six years. Over the years he either founded or was involved in numerous other projects and bands, including:

Cottonmouth Texas
Decadent Dub Team
HairyApesBMX
Maimou

Baird has collaborated with artists from various music genres, including Edie Brickell, Everlast, Evanescence (provided programming for their debut album "Fallen"), Colin Hay, Daniel Powter, Mike Dillon, and Stone Gossard.

He was auditioned for Nine Inch Nails:

Baird was also auditioned for alternative artist Beck; he describes it as great experience:

Baird toured with pop singer and pianist Daniel Powter through Europe in 2005. In late 2009 and early 2010, Baird was part of Adam Lambert's band, providing programming, working as his music director, and playing keyboards.

Work with Korn 
Baird has worked with nu metal band Korn, touring with them worldwide as a masked horse (which in turn, Baird got his nickname "Horse") in the See You on the Other Side tour, as well as in their 2006 edition of the Family Values Tour. He has temporarily joined the band for their eighth studio album. Collaboration with Korn and his previous projects was quite a difference for him:

On December 9, 2006, Baird performed with Korn on MTV Unplugged: Korn, playing piano. After the Bitch We Got a Problem Tour, Baird continued to work with Korn frontman Jonathan Davis on his Alone I Play tour, as a part of his backing band SFA. In 2011, Baird played the keyboard on Korn guitarist Munky's solo project, Fear and the Nervous System. He also toured with Korn during 2013's The Paradigm Shift tour, and the 20th Anniversary Tour from 2014 through 2015. As of early 2017, Baird is no longer collaborating with the band.

Discography 

1992 – "Bush Roaming Mammals" – Billy Goat
1994 – "Live at the Swingers Ball" – Billy Goat
1995 – "Black & White" – Billy Goat
1997 – "Anti-Social Butterfly" – Cottonmouth, Texas
1999 – "The Right to Remain Silent" – Cottonmouth, Texas
2000 – "Expatriape" – HairyApesBMX
2001 – "Out Demons" – HairyApesBMX
2001 – "Bayleaf" – Stone Gossard
2002 – "Ultimate Collection" – Edie Brickell and the New Bohemians
2002 – "Slow Drip Torture" – Maimou
2003 – "Fallen" – Evanescence
2004 – "Persephonics" – Maimou
2005 – "Just Like Heaven" – Soundtrack
2006 – "Chopped, Screwed, Live and Unglued"  – Korn
2007 – "MTV Unplugged: Korn" – Korn
2007 – "Untitled" – Korn
2007 – "Alone I Play" – Jonathan Davis and the SFA
2009 – "Digital EP #1" – Korn
2008 – "Nightmare Revisited" – various artists
2010 – "Digital EP #2" – Korn
2010 – "Digital EP #3" – Korn
2011 – "Alone I Play / Live at the Union Chapel" – Jonathan Davis and the SFA
2011 – "Fear and the Nervous System" – Fear and the Nervous System
2012 – "The Path of Totality Tour – Live at the Hollywood Palladium" – Korn
2012 – "The Truth About Love" – Pink
2012 – "Urn" – Mike Dillon
2013 – "Afraid of Heights" – Wavves

TV appearances 
 The Jay Leno Show
 The Tonight Show with Jay Leno
 The Tonight Show with Conan O'Brien
 David Letterman
 The Oprah Winfrey Show
 MTV Unplugged
 VH1's "Unplugged"
 Ellen DeGeneres
 American Music Awards
 Good Morning America
 The Today Show
 Lopez Tonight
 Jimmy Kimmel Live!

Keyboard instruments 

 Moog Synthesizers
 Access Virus
 Novation
 Analogue Systems
 Critter & Guitari
 Roland JX-305
 Roland JX-3P
 Roland JX-8P
 Roland JV-1080
 Roland TR-606
 Roland TR-707
 Roland TR-909
 Roland XP-80
 Clavia Nord Lead
 Clavia Nord Electro 2
 Clavia Nord Modular
 Korg M1
 Korg MS2000
 Kurzweil K2000
 Analog synthesizers
 Yamaha Piano
 Hammond Organ
 Ondes Martenot

See also 
 List of Moog synthesizer players

References

External links 

Zac Baird MySpace
Official site: Maimou

Musicians from Orange County, California
Living people
1971 births
Korn members
American rock keyboardists
Jonathan Davis and the SFA members
21st-century American keyboardists
Fear and the Nervous System members
20th-century American keyboardists